Ivan Petrovych Kotenko (born 28 April 1985) is a Ukrainian football midfielder who plays for FC Krymteplytsia Molodizhne in the Ukrainian First League. During the 2007–08 season, Kotenko was on loan at Naftovyk and in the 2008–09 season is on loan at FC Lviv from Dnipro Dnipropetrovsk.

External links

 Profile on Official Website
 Profile at football squads

1985 births
Living people
People from Borodyanka
Ukrainian footballers
FC Dnipro players
FC Kryvbas Kryvyi Rih players
FC Lviv players
FC Naftovyk-Ukrnafta Okhtyrka players
FC Obolon-Brovar Kyiv players
FC Krymteplytsia Molodizhne players
Ukrainian Premier League players
Association football midfielders
Sportspeople from Kyiv Oblast